Suli Daraq (also Romanized as Sūlī Daraq; also known as Sūl Daraq) is a village in Vilkij-e Shomali Rural District, in the Central District of Namin County, Ardabil Province, Iran. At the 2006 census, its population was 88, in 24 families.

References 

Towns and villages in Namin County